Sheridan is an unincorporated community in Colorado County, Texas, United States.

Education
Sheridan is served by the Rice Consolidated Independent School District.

The designated community college for Rice CISD is Wharton County Junior College.

References

External links 
 Colorado County official website
 

Unincorporated communities in Colorado County, Texas
Unincorporated communities in Texas